The Bewdley School is a senior school and sixth form in Bewdley, serving north-west Worcestershire, England. Its campus is very close to the River Severn and lies on the border of the Wyre Forest national nature reserve. 
Bewdley is an educational research partner of the University of Worcester and University of Birmingham and is recognised for its focus on international and cultural education. In 2019, Bewdley hosted the Global Happiness Conference in partnership with the British Council. The Bewdley School has close ties with the nearby Bewdley Rowing Club established in 1877.

In 2021, The Bewdley School became the founding member of The Bewdley School Foundation, in partnership with Bewdley Civic Society and Bewdley Festival. The purpose of the Foundation is to further develop the campus and wider school infrastructure, for the benefit of both the school and community. In March 2023, plans were announced to build a new 500-seat performing arts theatre at the school, as well as an extension of the Bewdley Sports Centre.

History

The school has its origins in The Bewdley Grammar School on Lax Lane, which closed in the 1800s. The former grammar school is now home to a yoga studio and the Bewdley brewery. After the closure of Bewdley Grammar School, Bewdley County Secondary School was built on the opposite side of the river in 1956 with new buildings. It was opened by Sir. Chad Woodward. In 1972, the area adopted a three-tier system, and the school became Bewdley High School. When the area returned to a two-tier system in 2007, the High School was amalgamated with the two local middle schools to form The Bewdley School as a new secondary school, following extensive building work and landscaping, with new facilities for the arts, science, humanities and outdoor learning.

Headteachers 
Charles Goodyear 1955-1968

Jack Harris 1968-1987

Margaret Griffiths 1987-2002

David Derbyshire 2002-2007

Julie Reilly 2007-2016 

David Hadley-Pryce 2016–present

Present day 
 The Bewdley School is made up of five teaching buildings (A to E) plus the separate sixth form building, lecture theatre and cafe. Bewdley's sports facilities consist of two sports halls, a dance studio, a main hall and two large sports fields. The school was listed as one of the schools to be rebuilt through the Building Schools for the Future project which was scrapped in 2010. However, the school has largely been rebuilt in stages with many new buildings and improvements since the scrapping of the scheme. In 2006, a new art and technology college facility was built in celebration of their 50th anniversary, at a cost of £1.8 million. The school's largest building block (E) was constructed by Yorkon in 2007, and cost £2.5 million to build.  In 2014, the school was awarded a third building grant to build a new state of the art science building (D), costing £2.8 million.

Bewdley Sixth Form
Bewdley Sixth Form is also part of The Bewdley School, offering GCSE, BTEC and A-Level courses. The sixth form is growing yearly, and in 2018 was the largest Sixth Form in the Wyre Forest District. Bewdley Sixth Form is consistently high performing at A-Level, with students often gaining places at top Russell Group UK universities.

In 2020, Bewdley Sixth Form was extensively rebuilt and modernised, including the development of a lecture theatre, sixth form cafe and study room.

Partnerships
The school is partnered with the University of Worcester for teacher training and further educational research. The University of Birmingham's School of Geography, Earth and Environmental Sciences works closely with The Bewdley School through their ongoing Encompass project. In September 2009, The Bewdley School gained Specialist Art college status via accreditation from Arts Council England. This specialism was later awarded the Arts Mark Gold Award for excellent practice amongst the department.

Results

In 2019, the school achieved 72% of students achieving 5+ GCSEs including English at Maths at grade 4 or above.  At Bewdley Sixth Form, 20 of the 21 subjects achieved 100% pass rates at A-Level with 96% of university applicants being successful.

In 2022, the first externally assessed year following the COVID-19 pandemic, The Bewdley School achieved a record percentage of students achieving the top grades at GCSE.

The school was inspected by Ofsted in September 2019 under their new framework, and found the school to be consistently Good. The school has held a 'Good' rating from Ofsted since 2012.

The House System
The Bewdley School has three distinct student houses, each made up of two tutor groups each. The houses were named after historical connections to the town of Bewdley.

 Baldwin - Named after Stanley Baldwin, three times Prime Minister. Stanley Baldwin, as Member of Parliament for Bewdley, is the only British premier to have served under three monarchs (George V, Edward VIII, and George VI).

 Ribbesford - Named after Ribbesford House. The estate dates from the 11th century (Anglo-Saxon Charter). In 1074 the estate was presented to Ralph de Mortimer in recognition of his services to William of Normandy. It remained in the Mortimer family for many centuries.

 Severn - Named after the River Severn. The river is about 230 miles long and is considered to be the longest in the United Kingdom. It rises from the Welsh mountains to the Atlantic Ocean at Bristol and it has historically been a route for trade and central to the growth of Bewdley as a market town over the last 500 years.

Awards

In May 2019, the school won Secondary School of the Year in the county of Worcesterhire, and was a finalist alongside Bishop Perowne Church of England College, St Augustine's High School, Redditch and Bowbrook House School.

Notable alumni 
 Primrose Archer, English model
Becky Hill, English Singer

References

Secondary schools in Worcestershire
Educational institutions established in 1955
1955 establishments in England
Foundation schools in Worcestershire
Bewdley